Wedding with Erika is a 1950 West German musical comedy film directed by Eduard von Borsody and starring Marianne Schönauer, Wolfgang Lukschy and Dorit Kreysler.

The film's sets were designed by the art director Alfred Bütow.

Cast
 Marianne Schönauer as Erika
 Wolfgang Lukschy as Fred
 Dorit Kreysler as Irene
 Hans Holt as Peter
 Charlott Daudert as Emilie
 Kurt Seifert as Baron Kroko
 Carsta Löck as Mathilde
 Erika von Thellmann as Mrs. Horsemeat
 Hans Zesch-Ballot as Colonel Hunter
 Carl Napp as Lukasmann
 Kurt Großkurth as Jakob

References

Bibliography
 Goble, Alan. The Complete Index to Literary Sources in Film. Walter de Gruyter, 1999.

External links 
 

1950 films
1950 musical comedy films
German musical comedy films
West German films
1950s German-language films
Films directed by Eduard von Borsody
Operetta films
Films based on operettas
German black-and-white films
Films scored by Eduard Künneke
1950s German films